American singer and songwriter Lisa Fischer has released one studio album and 14 singles (including 2 as a featured artist). She has performed background vocals on albums of many singers including Luther Vandross, Evelyn "Champagne" King, Nona Hendryx, Tina Turner, and many other singers.

Albums

Singles

As lead artist

As featured artist

Album/DVD/single appearances
1985: Luther Vandross - The Night I Fell in Love
1986: Randy Crawford - Abstract Emotions
1986: Bob James - Obsession
1989: The Rolling Stones - Mixed Emotions (single)
1989: The Rolling Stones - Rock and a Hard Place (single)
1989: The Rolling Stones - Terrifying (single)
1989: The Rolling Stones - Steel Wheels (album)
1989: The Rolling Stones - Another Side of Steel Wheels (album, CBS/Sony Japan)
1990: The Rolling Stones - Almost Hear You Sigh (single)
1990: Sam Riney - Playing With Fire (album)
1991: The Rolling Stones - Flashpoint (album)
1991: The Rolling Stones - Ruby Tuesday (live) (Maxi single)
1991: The Rolling Stones - Ruby Tuesday/Harlem Shuffle (live) (single)
1993: The Rolling Stones - Jump Back (album)
1994: The Rolling Stones - Live Voodoo Lounge – Live New Jersey, August 14, 1994 (Tour souvenir video)
1995: The Rolling Stones - Voodoo Lounge – Live Miami, November 25, 1994 (DVD/Video)
1995: The Rolling Stones - I Go Wild (single) backing vocals: live track
1995: The Rolling Stones - Like A Rolling Stone (single)
1995: The Rolling Stones - Stripped (album)
1995: The Rolling Stones - Voodoo Lounge CD Rom – Co-Starring: Lisa Fischer (CD Rom game)
1996: The Rolling Stones - Wild Horses (Maxi single) backing vocals: live tracks
1996: Luther Vandross - Your Secret Love
1996: Nicklebag - 12 Hits and a Bump (album)
1997: Grover Washington, Jr. - Breath of Heaven: A Holiday Collection
1997: Lee Ritenour - This Is Love (album)
1997: Nicklebag - Mas Feedback (album)
1997: The Rolling Stones - Saint of Me (CD-single) Incl. Gimme Shelter (live Amsterdam, 1995) Vocals: Lisa Fischer
1998: The Rolling Stones - No Security (album)
1999: The Rolling Stones - Bridges to Babylon Tour 97–98 (DVD/Video)
2000: Various Artists - A Love Affair: The Music of Ivan Lins
2001: Tina Turner - One Last Time Live in Concert - Live London, 2000 (DVD)
2002: The Rolling Stones - Forty Licks (album)
2003: The Rolling Stones -  Four Flicks – Live 2002/2003 Tour (4DVD)
2004: Chuck Leavell - What's in That Bag? (album)
2004: The Rolling Stones - Live Licks (album)
2004: Toronto Rocks (DVD)
2005: Tim Ries - The Rolling Stones Project (album)
2005: The Rolling Stones - Rarities 1971–2003 (album)
2005: Raul Midon - State of Mind
2006: Bernard Fowler - Friends with Privileges (Super Audio CD, Village Records Inc., Japan)
2006: Bernard Fowler - Friends with Privileges (album)
2006: The Rolling Stones - Biggest Mistake (single) backing vocals: 2 live tracks
2007: Kim Water - You Are My Lady (album)
2007: The Rolling Stones - The Biggest Bang – Live 2005/2006 Tour (4DVD)
2008: Aretha Franklin - This Christmas, Aretha (album)
2008: Tim Ries - Stones World (album)
2008: The Rolling Stones - Shine a Light (CD/DVD)
2009: Tina Turner - Tina Live (DVD/CD)
2009: Sting - If on a Winter's Night
2009: Sting - A Winter's Night Live from Durham Cathedral (DVD)
2010: Bobby McFerrin - VOCAbuLarieS
2010: The Rolling Stones - Exile on Main St. (remastered, backing vocals: CD2, bonus tracks) (album)
2010: The Rolling Stones - Exile On Main St. Rarities edition (album, USA release)
2010: The Rolling Stones - Plunded My Soul (Record Store Day single)
2010: Wingless Angels - Volumes I & II (album)
2011: Linda Chorney – Emotional Jukebox
2011: The Rolling Stones - Singles Box Set (1971–2006) Box Set Limited Edition 45CD's
2012: Chris Botti - Impressions (album)
2012: The Rolling Stones - Live at the Tokyo Dome (a digital official download through Google Music)
2012: The Rolling Stones - Light the Fuse (a digital official download through Google Music)
2012: The Rolling Stones - GRRR! (album)
2013: 121212 the Concert for Sandy Relief (CD/DVD)
2013: The Rolling Stones - Sweet Summer Sun (2CD/DVD)
2013: John Mayer - Paradise Valley (album) 
2013: Elements of Life - Eclipse Ibiza / Eclipse (album)
2014: Billy Childs- Map to the Treasure: Reimagining Laura Nyro (album)
2015: Bernard Fowler - The Bura (album)
2015: The Rolling Stones - Live at the Tokyo Dome (2CD/DVD)
2015: The Rolling Stones - From the Vault: Complete Series 1 (5DVD Box set) 
2016: Louie Vega - Starring... XXVIII (CD/Album)
2016: Yo-Yo Ma and the Silk Road Ensemble - Sing Me Home (album)
2016: The Rolling Stones - Totally Stripped (CD/DVD)
2016: Lang Lang - New York Rhapsody (album)
2016: Lang Lang - Live at Lincoln Center Presents New York Rhapsody (DVD/Blu-ray)
2017: The Rolling Stones - Sticky Fingers – Live at the Fonda Theatre 2015 (CD/DVD)
2018: The Rolling Stones - San Jose '99 (CD/DVD) 
2018: The Rolling Stones - Voodoo Lounge Uncut (CD/DVD) 
2019: The Rolling Stones - HONK (2CD) 
2019: The Rolling Stones - Bridges to Buenos Aires (CD/DVD) 
2020: The Rolling Stones - Steel Wheels Live (CD/DVD)
2020: The Rolling Stones - Steel Wheels Live (10" Vinyl, 2 track, Picture Disc, RSD 2020) 
2021: The Rolling Stones - A Bigger Bang Live (10" Vinyl, 2 track, RSD 2021) 
2021: The Rolling Stones - A Bigger Bang: Live on Copacabana Beach
2022: The Rolling Stones - Licked Live in NYC
2022: The Rolling Stones - Grrr Live!

Soundtrack appearances

Notes

References

External links
 
 

Pop music discographies
Rhythm and blues discographies
Soul music discographies